The 2018 BC Lions season was the 61st season for the team in the Canadian Football League (CFL) and their 65th overall. The Lions improved upon their 7–11 record from 2017 and clinched a playoff berth following a week 19 win over the Edmonton Eskimos. They returned to the playoffs following a one-year absence where they missed the playoffs for the first time since 1996. However, the team lost the East Semi-Final to the Hamilton Tiger-Cats by a 40-point margin, which is the largest in the Lions' playoff history.

On November 30, 2017, Wally Buono stepped down as general manager, being replaced by Ed Hervey in that role. Buono stayed on as head coach, which was his 12th and final season in that role. He finished his Lions coaching tenure with a record of 129-86-1, making the playoffs in 11 of his 12 seasons coached and winning two Grey Cup championships.

This was the ninth consecutive season that the Lions held their training camp at Hillside Stadium in Kamloops, British Columbia. Main camp opened Sunday, May 20, 2018, with rookies reporting earlier.

Offseason

CFL draft
The 2018 CFL Draft took place on May 3, 2018. The Lions had seven selections in the eight round draft, but have made several trades for positioning. They traded their fourth-round pick to Ottawa for Odell Willis, but got first and second-round picks from Winnipeg in exchange for the Lions' second-round pick this year and a first-round pick next year. The team acquired Saskatchewan's sixth-round pick in exchange for Mike Edem and the Lions' eighth-round pick.

Preseason

Schedule

 Games played with colour uniforms.

Regular season

Standings

Schedule

 Games played with colour uniforms.
 Games played with white uniforms.

Post-season

Schedule 

 Games played with white uniforms.

Team

Roster

Coaching staff

References

BC Lions seasons
2018 Canadian Football League season by team
2018 in British Columbia